Nathan Cleary (born 14 November 1997) is an Australian professional rugby league footballer who plays as a  the Penrith Panthers in the NRL and Australia at international level. He won both the 2021 and the 2022 NRL Grand Finals with the Panthers. 

He is best known for his accurate kicking game, playmaking, goalkicking and vision. He won the Clive Churchill Medal in 2021. 

He has represented the NSW Blues in State of Origin and also played for City NSW.

Background
Cleary is the son of coach and former professional rugby league footballer Ivan Cleary who coaches him at the Penrith Panthers.

Cleary was born in Sydney, New South Wales, Australia.

He spent a number of his childhood years living in Auckland, New Zealand while his father was playing for, and later coaching, the New Zealand Warriors. Attended Sacred Heart College, Auckland for two years and having grown up playing soccer, Cleary switched to rugby league during his pre-teens, playing at a junior level for the Mount Albert Lions in Auckland and the Penrith Brothers in Sydney. He completed his HSC while attending St Dominic's College, Penrith in 2015, where he was a prefect.

Cleary is of Croatian descent. He is the nephew of Josh Stuart and Jason Death. He previously held a New Zealand passport.

Playing career

Early career
Cleary progressed through the Penrith club's junior system, playing in their Harold Matthews Cup (under 16) and S. G. Ball Cup (under 18) teams, the latter of which he captained in 2015. 

Cleary appeared for the Windsor Wolves in the Ron Massey Cup and Sydney Shield in a handful of games, before being called into Penrith's National Youth Competition (under 20) squad mid-season. Cleary was unavailable to play in Penrith's 2015 NYC Grand Final winning team due to his selection in the Australian Schoolboys team, whom he captained during their two match series against New Zealand under-18s. Cleary played 20 games, scoring 11 tries and kicking 109 goals for 262 points in his U20s career from 2015 to 2016.

2016
Starting the season as Penrith's first-choice halfback in the NYC, Cleary was selected to play for the Junior Kangaroos against the Junior Kiwis in May, where he played at five-eighth scoring a try and kicking 5 goals in the 34-20 win. He made his New South Wales Cup debut for the Penrith club in round 11, the only game he'd play in that competition in 2016. On 2 June, Cleary extended his contract with the Panthers until the end of the 2019 season; his decision to do so voided a 'father-son' clause in his contract, which would have allowed him to leave the club following his father's dismissal as Penrith's head coach late the previous year, had he so pleased.

Two days after the signing, in round 13, Cleary made his NRL debut for the Penrith Panthers against the Melbourne Storm at five-eighth. Despite a 6-24 defeat at AAMI Park, Cleary had a great debut; making 38 tackles. The next week against the Manly-Warringah Sea Eagles, Cleary scored his first NRL try, as well as kicking five goals in Penrith's 31-24 win at Brookvale Oval. Following a man of the match performance against the South Sydney Rabbitohs in round 15, The Daily Telegraph said of Cleary: "[it's] hard to believe he is only 18 playing his third NRL game. Composed under pressure, kicked well and supported inside for a crucial second half try."

After the departure of seasoned half Jamie Soward and Peter Wallace shifting to hooker, Cleary remained at halfback for the rest of the season. He was in the race for the rookie of the year award, but lost to the Gold Coast Titans halfback, Ashley Taylor. He finished his debut season with 3 tries and 52 goals from 15 matches. He was the Penrith club's highest point-scorer with 116 points. Cleary was rewarded with being named in the emerging NSW Blues squad.

2017
Cleary was named in Penrith's squad for the 2017 NRL Auckland Nines. On 1 May, Cleary was named in the NSW City Origin representative team to play in the last ever City vs Country game.

Cleary finished the season as highest pointscorer in the NRL with a total of 228 points, the youngest player to achieve this since 1913. He played in all 26 games for the Penrith club, scoring 11 tries and kicking 92 goals. Cleary also became the youngest player ever to score 200 points in a season.

2018
Cleary started the 2018 season as possibly the NRL’s form player before suffering a knee injury in Round 3 against Canterbury-Bankstown where Penrith lost 20-18 at ANZ Stadium. While he was out with the injury, Cleary was still leading in contention for the halfback spot for New South Wales. Cleary made his return to the field in Round 11 against his father’s team the Wests Tigers, where he helped steer the Penrith club to a 16-2 victory at Penrith Stadium. In his next performance in Round 12 against table toppers the St George Illawarra Dragons, Cleary earned his spot in the New South Wales squad after a fine match, scoring a try as Penrith won convincingly 28-2 at Penrith Stadium. 

On 6 June 2018, Cleary made his debut for New South Wales in Game 1 of the 2018 State of Origin series against Queensland, starting at halfback in the 22-12 win at the MCG. Later that week, he kicked the match winning field goal in Penrith's 23–22 win over Canberra at GIO Stadium. He played in all 3 Origin games that year for the Blues at halfback.

2019
In the opening rounds of the 2019 season, Cleary had been criticized by sections of the media and fans for Penrith's underwhelming start to the season.  In Round 4, Cleary kicked a goal from the sideline after the final siren to send their game against the Wests Tigers into extra time.  Cleary then kicked a 40 metre field goal to win the game for Penrith 9-8.

On 27 May, Cleary was selected at halfback for New South Wales in Game 1 of the 2019 State of Origin series despite his lacklustre start to the year and with Penrith only managing 2 wins from their first 9 games.  Despite New South Wales losing the first game, Cleary was retained for the second game in Perth which New South Wales won 38-6 at Perth Stadium.

In Round 18 against St George, Cleary scored a try and kicked 6 goals as Penrith won the match 40-18 at Penrith Park.

In round 25, the final game of the year, Cleary scored 4 tries and kicked 9 goals in their 54-10 victory over Newcastle. In this game Cleary scored 34 points to have the 2nd most points scored in a single game in the NRL. Cleary put on a master class despite this game having no impact on the finals as Penrith finished a disappointing 10th.

2020
In round 12, Cleary scored one try and kicked seven goals as Penrith defeated Manly 42–12 at Brookvale Oval.

In the 2020 qualifying final against the Sydney Roosters, Cleary scored a hat-trick and kicked a field goal in Penrith's 29–28 victory.

Cleary played a total of 21 games for Penrith in the 2020 NRL season including the grand final. He threw a pass in the first half of the match which was intercepted by Melbourne winger Suliasi Vunivalu who raced away to score a try at a pivotal moment in the game, but scored a last minute try and kicked two goals in the 26–20 loss.

Cleary was selected by New South Wales for the 2020 State of Origin series. He played poorly in the game 1 loss, with Andrew Johns calling for him to be dropped. Roy Masters said, "Cleary has a weakness and the Maroons have identified it. Cleary's below-par performances in the NRL grand final and the first State of Origin match are directly related to the pressure imposed on his kicking game." He was awarded man of the match in game 2 of the series, where he was praised for his exceptional kicking game, but another loss in game 3 saw a shock 2-1 series defeat. He said after, "2020 as a whole has been a roller coaster, really. I've ridden the highs and lows. I've lost some pretty big games in the last month."

2021
In round 10, Cleary scored a hat-trick and kicked eight goals in Penrith's 48-12 victory over the Gold Coast. The following week, he scored two tries and kicked ten goals in Penrith's 56-12 victory over South Sydney.

Cleary kicked eight goals for New South Wales in the opening game of the 2021 State of Origin series as they defeated Queensland 50-6.

On 30 June, it was announced Cleary would be unable to play for an indefinite period after suffering a shoulder injury. In round 22, he made his return to the Penrith team in a 34-16 victory over St. George Illawarra.

Cleary played a total of 20 games for Penrith in the 2021 NRL season including the club's 2021 NRL Grand Final victory over South Sydney. Cleary was awarded the Clive Churchill Medal for being man of the match. He was also named Dally M Halfback of the year.

On 19 October, Cleary was handed a proposed $7000 fine by the NRL and a breach notice which alleges that he acted contrary to the best interests of the game after he was photographed on social media acting in a disrespectful manner toward the NRL Telstra Premiership Trophy. Although Cleary nor any of the Penrith players had broken the trophy, the NRL alleges Cleary and teammate Stephen Crichton showed disrespect towards the individuals depicted in the iconic moment memorialised on the Trophy.

2022
On 29 May, Cleary was selected by New South Wales to play in game one of the 2022 State of Origin series.

In round 14 of the 2022 NRL season, Cleary scored a try and kicked seven goals in Penrith's 42-6 victory over Newcastle.

In game 2 of the 2022 State of Origin series, Cleary scored two tries and kicked eight goals in New South Wales 44-12 victory over Queensland.

In game 3, New South Wales were behind 16-12 against Queensland with less than two minutes remaining when Cleary elected a chip kick over the top of the defensive line which was intercepted by Queensland's Ben Hunt who ran 70 metres to score the match winning try.
In round 20, Cleary was sent off in Penrith's 34-10 loss against Parramatta for a dangerous lifting tackle.

On 30 July, Cleary was suspended for five games over the tackle which meant he would miss the remainder of the 2022 regular season.

In the 2022 Qualifying Final, Cleary returned to the Penrith side and put in a man of the match performance in the clubs 27-8 victory over Parramatta.

Cleary played for 17 games for Penrith throughout the year including their 2022 NRL Grand Final victory over Parramatta.

In October he was named in the Australia squad for the 2021 Rugby League World Cup. In the second match of Australia's 2021 Rugby League World Cup campaign, Cleary made his debut for Australia scoring one try and kicking 12 goals during a 84-0 victory over Scotland. Cleary played for Australia in their 2021 Rugby League World Cup final victory over Samoa.

2023
On 18 February, Cleary played in Penrith's 13-12 upset loss to St Helens RFC in the 2023 World Club Challenge.

Honours
Individual
 Ben Alexander Rookie of the Year: 2016
 Penrith Panthers Members' Player of the Year: 2016, 2020
 Merv Cartwright Medal: 2020, 2021
 RLPA Halfback of the Year: 2020, 2021
 RLPA Players' Champion: 2020
 Brad Fittler Medal: 2020
 Dally M Halfback of the Year: 2020, 2021
 Clive Churchill Medal: 2021

Penrith Panthers
 NRL Premiership: 2021, 2022
 NRL Minor Premiership: 2020, 2022
 NRL Grand Final Runners-up: 2020

New South Wales
 State of Origin series: 2018, 2019, 2021

Australia
 World Cup: 2021

Coronavirus controversy
On 28 April 2020, Cleary was fined $10,000 after breaking protocols during the COVID-19 pandemic. Cleary was pictured at his home with a group of women on ANZAC Day and the photo was uploaded to social media. Cleary later apologized to the Penrith club and his teammates over the incident.

However, a video of Cleary dancing with the women emerged, thus bringing the validity of his apology into question. For lying about the incident, Cleary was hit with a 2-match ban as well as a $30,000 fine. It was then revealed that Cleary lied about the girls visiting his house and actually went to pick them up.

References

External links

Penrith Panthers profile
NRL profile

1997 births
Living people
Australia national rugby league team players
Australian people of Croatian descent
Australian rugby league players
New South Wales City Origin rugby league team players
New South Wales Rugby League State of Origin players
Penrith Panthers players
Junior Kangaroos players
Windsor Wolves players
Penrith Panthers captains
Rugby league halfbacks
Rugby league players from Sydney
Clive Churchill Medal winners